David Morrell (27 October 1926 – 5 December 1974) was a Welsh actor.

Film appearances
The Dam Busters (1955) – Flight Lieutenant W. Astell, D.F.C.
Simon and Laura (1955) – T.V. Producer
A Hill in Korea (1956) – The Regular Soldiers: Pte. Henson / Pte Henson
The Adventures of Hal 5 (1958) – Dicey
Death and the Sky Above (1961)
 Two Letter Alibi (1962) – Detective Sergeant Day
Three Hats for Lisa (1965) – P.C. Hanbury

Television appearances
The Adventures of Sir Lancelot: 21 episodes (1956–57)
This Day in Fear TV film (1958)
BBC Sunday-Night Play: The Squeeze (1960)
Pathfinders in Space: Spaceship from Nowhere (1960)
The True Mystery of the Passion TV film (1960)
Five Bells for Logan TV film (1961)
Three Live Wires: The Play Off (1961)
BBC Sunday-Night Play: Six Men of Dorset (1962)
Garry Halliday: Two for the Price of One (1962)
No Hiding Place: Little Girl Stolen (1962)
Suspense: A Ride in a Pram (1963)
The Plane Makers: The Testing Time (1963)
Coronation Street: Episode No. 1.248 (1963)
Lorna Doone: 5 episodes (1963)
The Saint: The Well Meaning Mayor (1963)
Meet the Wife: The Strain (1964)
Theatre 625: Women in Crisis No. 3: My Grandmother (1964)
The Villains: Hideaway (1964)
The Scales of Justice: Personal and Confidential (1965)
No Hiding Place: Found Dead (1965)
The Man in Room 17: The Years of Glory (1965)
R3: Unwelcome Visitor (1965)

References

External links

1926 births
1974 deaths
20th-century English male actors
English male film actors
English male television actors